Ballifeary is district of Inverness, Scotland. It is situated a half-mile (1 km) south southwest of the town centre. The B-listed Ballifeary House on Ness Walk dates from the mid-19th century, but has been a care home run by the Free Presbyterian Church of Scotland since 1964. Bught Park lies immediately to the south.

Areas of Inverness